Martial Fesselier (born 9 October 1961 in Rennes, Ille-et-Vilaine) is a retired male race walker from France, who competed in four consecutive Summer Olympics during his career, starting in 1984.

Achievements

References

1961 births
Living people
French male racewalkers
Olympic athletes of France
Athletes (track and field) at the 1984 Summer Olympics
Athletes (track and field) at the 1988 Summer Olympics
Athletes (track and field) at the 1992 Summer Olympics
Athletes (track and field) at the 1996 Summer Olympics
Sportspeople from Rennes
20th-century French people